Lee Chi-Joon  (born January 20, 1985) is a South Korean football player who since 2014 has played for Suwon FC.

References

1985 births
Living people
South Korean footballers
Seongnam FC players
Ansan Mugunghwa FC players
Suwon FC players
K League 1 players
K League 2 players
Chung-Ang University alumni
Association football defenders